Senator Spencer may refer to:

Members of the United States Senate
George E. Spencer (1836–1893), U.S. Senator from Alabama from 1868 to 1879
Lloyd Spencer (1893–1981), U.S. Senator from Arkansas from 1941 to 1943
Selden P. Spencer (1862–1925), U.S. Senator from Missouri from 1918 to 1925

United States state senate members
Ambrose Spencer (1765–1848), New York State Senate
John Canfield Spencer (1788–1855), New York State Senate
Joseph Spencer (New York politician) (1790–1823), New York State Senate
Joshua A. Spencer (1790–1857), New York State Senate
Mark Spencer (New York politician) (1787–1859), New York State Senate
W. Thomas Spencer (1928–2018), Florida State Senate

See also
Senator Spence (disambiguation)